Teck may refer to:

 Teck Castle (Burg Teck) in Württemberg, Germany
 Teckberg, mountain on which it is located
 Duke of Teck, a title of nobility, associated with Teck Castle
 Teck Railway, Germany
 Teck Resources, a Canadian mining company formerly known as Teck Cominco
 CCL25, a cytokine also known as "Teck"
 Katherine Teck, an American author and composer
 Lai Teck, a Malayan communist leader
 Lim Koon Teck, a Singaporean politician

See also